The following is a list of current and pending affiliates of True Crime Network, a digital multicast television network owned by Justice Network, LLC, focusing on crime and investigation documentary programming.

Current affiliates

Former affiliates

References

External links
 Official list of Justice Network affiliates (includes information on cable channel placements)

Justice Network